The 2018–19 season is Sociedad Deportiva Huesca's inaugural season in the Spanish top-flight after achieving a historic promotion in the previous season in Segunda División.

Squad

Current squad/Statistics
{|cellpadding="4" cellspacing="0" border="1" style="text-align: center; font-size: 85%; border: gray solid 1px; border-collapse: collapse;"
|-style="background:#000088; color:red;
! rowspan="2"| No
! rowspan="2"| Pos
! rowspan="2"| Name
! rowspan="2"| Age
! colspan="4"| La Liga
! colspan="4"| Copa del Rey
! rowspan="2"| Since
! rowspan="2"| Signed from
! rowspan="2"| Notes
|- style="background:#000088; color:red;"
! Apps
! 
! 
! 
! Apps
! 
! 
! 
|-
|colspan="17" style="background:#000088; color:red; text-align:center;"| Goalkeepers
|-
|1||GK||align="left"| Javi Varas||||0||0||0||0||0||0||0||0||2019 (Winter)||align="left"|Granada||
|-bgcolor="#EFEFEF"
|13||GK||align="left"| Roberto Santamaría||||0||0||0||0||0||0||0||0||2018 (Winter)||align="left"|Reus||
|-
|25||GK||align="left"| Aleksandar Jovanović||||6||0||0||0||0||0||0||0||2018||align="left"| AGF Aarhus||
|-
|colspan="15" style="background:#000088; color:red; text-align:center;"| Defenders
|-
|3||CB||align="left"| Xabier Etxeita||||7+1||1||0||0||0||0||0||0||2018||align="left"|Athletic Bilbao (on loan)||
|-bgcolor="#EFEFEF"
|4||CB||align="left"| Adrián Diéguez||||0||0||0||0||0||0||0||0||2019 (Winter)||align="left"|Alavés (on loan)||
|-
|12||LB||align="left"| Javi Galán||||0||0||0||0||0||0||0||0||2019 (Winter)||align="left"|Córdoba||
|-bgcolor="#EFEFEF"
|14||CB||align="left"| Jorge Pulido||||11||1||1||0||0||0||0||0||2017||align="left"| Sint-Truiden||
|-
|15||CB/RB||align="left"| Carlos Akapo||||5+1||0||1||0||0||0||0||0||2016||align="left"|Valencia B||
|-bgcolor="#EFEFEF"
|16||LB||align="left"| Luisinho||||6||0||3||0||0||0||0||0||2018||align="left"|Deportivo La Coruña||
|-
|18||CB||align="left"| Pablo Insua||||1||0||0||0||0||0||0||0||2018||align="left"| Schalke 04 (on loan)||
|-bgcolor="#EFEFEF"
|24||RB/CM||align="left"| Jorge Miramón||||12||1||3||0||0||0||0||0||2018||align="left"|Reus||
|-
|colspan="15" style="background:#000088; color:red; text-align:center;"| Midfielders
|-
|5||CM||align="left"| Juan Aguilera||||3+1||0||0||0||0||0||0||0||2016||align="left"| Mumbai City||
|-bgcolor="#EFEFEF"
|6||AM||align="left"| Moi Gómez||||10+1||1||0||0||0||0||0||0||2018||align="left"|Sporting Gijón (on loan)||
|-
|7||MF||align="left"| David Ferreiro||||6+5||0||3||0||0||0||0||0||2016||align="left"|Lugo||
|-bgcolor="#EFEFEF"
|8||CM||align="left"| Gonzalo Melero (C)||||6+1||1||0||0||0||0||0||0||2016||align="left"|Ponferradina||
|-
|10||AM||align="left"| Juanjo Camacho||||0||0||0||0||0||0||0||0||2008||align="left"|Vecindario||
|-bgcolor="#EFEFEF"
|11||FW/LW||align="left"| Álex Gallar||||7+5||3||2||0||0||0||0||0||2017||align="left"|Cultural Leonesa||
|-
|17||DM||align="left"| Christian Rivera||||0+1||0||0||0||0||0||0||0||2018||align="left"|Las Palmas (on loan)||
|-bgcolor="#EFEFEF"
|20||AM||align="left"| Juanpi||||0||0||0||0||0||0||0||0||2019 (Winter)||align="left"|Málaga (on loan)||
|-
|21||MF||align="left"| Yangel Herrera||||0||0||0||0||0||0||0||0||2019 (Winter)||align="left"| Manchester City (on loan)||
|-bgcolor="#EFEFEF"
|23||MF||align="left"| Damián Musto||||10||0||7||0||0||0||0||0||2018||align="left"| Tijuana (on loan)||
|-
|colspan="15" style="background:#000088; color:red; text-align:center;"| Forwards
|-
|9||FW||align="left"| Cucho Hernández||||10+2||1||2||0||0||0||0||0||2017||align="left"| Watford (on loan)||
|-bgcolor="#EFEFEF"
|19||AM||align="left"| Chimy Ávila||||4+6||1||4||0||0||0||0||0||2017||align="left"| San Lorenzo (on loan)||
|-
|22||ST||align="left"| Enric Gallego||||0||0||0||0||0||0||0||0||2019 (Winter)||align="left"|Extremadura||
|-
|colspan="15" style="background:#000088; color:red; text-align:center;"| Players who have made an appearance, but have left the club
|-
|21||RW||align="left"| Serdar Gürler||||5+4||0||2||0||0||0||0||0||2018||align="left"| Osmanlıspor||
|-bgcolor="#EFEFEF"
|22||DM||align="left"| Lluís Sastre||||1||0||0||0||0||0||0||0||2017||align="left"|Leganés||
|-
|12||ST||align="left"| Samuele Longo||||6+5||0||2||0||0||0||0||0||2018||align="left"| Internazionale (on loan)|||
|-bgcolor="#EFEFEF"
|4|||CB/DM||align="left"| Rúben Semedo||||9+2||0||4||0||0||0||0||0||2018||align="left"|Villarreal (on loan)||
|-
|20||LB||align="left"| Rajko Brežančić||||0+1||0||0||0||0||0||0||0||2016||align="left"| AZ||
|-bgcolor="#EFEFEF"
|1||GK||align="left"| Axel Werner||||6||0||0||0||0||0||0||0||2018||align="left"|Atlético Madrid (on loan)|||

Players in

1. Joined 1 January 2019.
Total spending:  €7,000,000

Players out

Total income:  €400,000 million

Net:  €6,600,000

Competitions

Pre-season
Kickoff times are in CEST or CET.

Overall

Primera División

League table

Results summary

Matches
Source: Kickoff times are in CEST or CET.

Copa del Rey

Source: Kickoff times are in CEST or CET.

References
Citations

External links

Huesca
SD Huesca seasons